Dryotribini is a tribe of beetles in the subfamily Cossoninae.

Genera 
Agrilochilus - Allopentarthrum - Amaurorhinus - Ampharthropelma - Arecocryptus - Arecophaga - Atopoxydema - Barretonus - Benius - Caenopentarthrum - Catolethrobius - Catolethrus - Caulophilus - Caulotrupis - Cotaster - Cotasteroloeblia - Dryotribodes - Dryotribus - Echinomorphus - Elgoniella - Entium - Hexacoptus - Howdeniola - Iliolus - Isodryotribus - Lixomimus - Macrorhyncolus - Mahnertia - Microcopes - Micromimus - Microtribodes - Microtribus - Necrodryophthorus - Nesmicrocopes - Ochronanus - Paralicus - Peltophoridus - Pentarthrodes - Pentarthrophasis - Pentatemnodes - Pentatemnus - Pentebathmus - Pogonorhinus - Pseudomesoxenus - Salvagopselactus - Sengletius - Sericotrogus - Stenomimus - Stenotoura - Stenotribus - Stilbocara - Synommatodes - Toura - Trichopentarthrum - Uluguruella - Unas - ?Allaorus - ?Eiratus - ?Etheophanus - ?Exeiratus - ?Paedaretus - ?Stilboderma

References 

 Alonso-Zarazaga, M.A.; Lyal, C.H.C. 1999: A world catalogue of families and genera of Curculionoidea (Insecta: Coleoptera) (excepting Scolytidae and Platypodidae). Entomopraxis, Barcelona. 
 Kuschel, G. 1964: Insects of Campbell Island. Coleoptera: Curculionidae of the subantarctic islands of New Zealand. Pacific insects monograph, 7: 416–493.
 Leschen, R.A.B.; Lawrence, J.F.; Kuschel, G.; Thorpe, S.; Wang, Q. 2003: Coleoptera genera of New Zealand. New Zealand entomologist, 26: 15–28.
 LeConte, J.L. & Horn, G.H. 1876: The Rhynchophora of America North of Mexico. Proceedings of the American Philosophical Society, 15(96): i-xvi + 1–455.
 Macfarlane, R.P. et al. 2010: [Chapter] NINE Phylum ARTHROPODA SUBPHYLUM HEXAPODA Protura, springtails, Diplura, and insects. pp. 233–467 in Gordon, D.P. (ed.): New Zealand inventory of biodiversity. Volume 2. Kingdom Animalia. Chaetognatha, Ecdysozoa, ichnofossils. Canterbury University Press, Christchurch, New Zealand.

External links 

 bugguide.net

Cossoninae